Mark Kealiʻi Hoʻomalu (born August 10, 1959) is a contemporary Hawaiian chanter, who was born and raised in ʻAiea, Oʻahu. He is best known for his contributions to the soundtrack of the 2002 Disney animated film, Lilo & Stitch, providing the film's two non-Elvis Presley-related songs.

Career
At the age of 15, Hoʻomalu started his hula career with John Piʻilani Watkins doing various lūʻau and Polynesian shows around Oʻahu.

In 1979, he joined a hālau, which became the foundation for Mark's hula education as an ʻolapa and chanter.

Hoʻomalu moved to California in 1979 to teach hula with Tiare Clifford of Tiare Otea in San Francisco. After refining much of his teaching technique under Clifford's direction, he was introduced to Bea and Herb Hew Len. In 1988 they turned over the directorship of their hālau, Nā Mele Hula ʻOhana to Hoʻomalu.

Nā Mele Hula ʻOhana set high standards in hula competitions along the West Coast and in Hawaiʻi. They were invited to the prestigious Merrie Monarch Festival in 1997, where their men placed fourth in the hula kahiko (ancient hula) competition. They returned to the Merrie Monarch each year through 2000. Hoʻomalu disbanded the hālau in early 2002. He continues to teach seminars throughout country.

Lilo & Stitch
In June 2002, Walt Disney Pictures released their animated feature film, Lilo & Stitch, which prominently featured two songs performed by Hoʻomalu along with The Kamehameha Schools Children's Chorus: a traditional song called "He Mele No Lilo" and an original song written by Hoʻomalu especially for the film, "Hawaiian Roller Coaster Ride".

Academy of Hawaiian Arts 

In February 2003, he opened a new halau, the Academy of Hawaiian Arts. The hālau has participated in many events around California, including the Iā ʻOe E Ka Lā Hula Competition in Pleasanton and San Francisco's Aloha Festival. They most recently danced at the prestigious Merrie Monarch Hula Festival in Hilo, Hawaiʻi this past April.

His style is both innovative and controversial, as purists disapprove of the liberties he takes in creating new arrangements of ancient chants. He was selected to perform at halftime of the 2013 Hawaii Bowl game.

Discography
Poʻokela Chants (1999)
Lilo & Stitch: An Original Walt Disney Records Soundtrack (2002), featured on two tracks.

Call It What You Like… (2003)
Traditional Limits (2018), stylized as TraditionaLimits.

References

External links

MKH Productions: Mark Kealiʻi Hoʻomalu's Official Web Site
American Aloha: Hula Beyond Hawai'i: PBS documentary about hula practiced on the mainland U.S. featuring Mark Kealiʻi Hoʻomalu

1959 births
Living people
Songwriters from Hawaii
American percussionists
Hawaiian songwriters
Native Hawaiian musicians
Singers from Hawaii
Lilo & Stitch (franchise)